The Gatorade 2014 Philippine Basketball Association (PBA) Rookie Draft was an event which allowed teams to draft players from the amateur ranks. The event was held at Midtown Atrium, Robinsons Place Manila on August 24, 2014.

Draft lottery
The lottery determined the team that will obtain the first pick in the draft. The remaining first-round picks and the second-round picks were assigned to teams in reverse order of their cumulative final rankings in the previous season with heavier weight from the results of the Philippine Cup.

Lottery teams—green: 67% chance; blue: 33% chance

The lottery was held on July 1, 2014, before the start of the Game 1 of the 2014 PBA Governors' Cup Finals at the Mall of Asia Arena in Pasay. The GlobalPort Batang Pier won the rights to the first overall selection against the Meralco Bolts. Due to a previous transaction, the draft rights of Meralco belongs to the Rain or Shine Elasto Painters from the Ronjay Buenafe trade on August 28, 2012.

Controversy
The matter on how the draft lottery is conducted became the subject of criticism from the fans and from Rain or Shine coach Yeng Guiao for lacking credibility and transparency. The league used three balls (two represents GlobalPort and one for Meralco) and were placed in a white box. Commissioner Chito Salud placed the balls inside the white box and drew the winner of the draft, without removing his hand first after placing the balls in the box. A formal request by Rain or Shine for a re-draw was sent to the league's board of governors. On July 4, Commissioner Salud apologized on the crudeness of the draft lottery procedures; however, he insisted that it was an honest mistake on their part by not checking out the minor details of the lottery and its proceedings.

During an emergency meeting of the Board of Governors, it was decided that no re-draw will be held after Rain or Shine and the board accepted the public apology of Commissioner Salud last July 4. The league's board and management committee will review the procedures of the lottery draw to prevent the issues raised to happen again.

Draft

1st round

2nd round

3rd round
Starting the third round, only Kia and Blackwater are allowed to draft players.

4th round

Trades involving draft picks

Pre-draft trades
  On June 28, 2012, Rain or Shine acquired a 2014 first round pick from Meralco in exchange for Ronjay Buenafe.
  On January 22, 2013, in a three-team trade, San Miguel (as Petron) acquired Ronald Tubid from Barako Bull, the Energy acquired Alex Mallari, Jojo Duncil and a 2014 first round pick from Petron and JC Intal, Jonas Villanueva and Aldrech Ramos from San Mig Coffee, and the Mixers acquired Leo Najorda, Lester Alvarez, Mallari and the draft pick from the Energy.
  On October 12, 2009, in a three-team trade, Barako Bull (as Burger King) acquired 2012 and 2013 first round pick from Talk 'N Text, and 2010 and 2012 first round picks from Barako Energy Coffee via the Tropang Texters; the Coffee Masters acquired Orlando Daroya from the Tropang Texters; and the Tropang Texters acquired Japeth Aguilar from the Whoppers. The Coffee Masters franchise was later sold, first to become the Shopinas.com Clickers/Air21 Express and then it was sold again to become the NLEX Road Warriors.
  On September 3, 2010, Barako Bull (as Air21) acquired a 2014 first round pick from San Mig Coffee (as B-Meg) in a three-team trade with San Miguel.
  On August 28, 2011, Alaska acquired a 2014 second round pick from Meralco in exchange for the draft rights to 17th pick Gilbert Bulawan.
  On August 26, 2011, Rain or Shine acquired J.R. Quiñahan, Norman Gonzales, and 2013 and 2014 second round picks from Powerade in exchange for Doug Kramer and Josh Vanlandingham. The Tigers franchise was later sold to GlobalPort and became the Batang Pier.
  On September 20, 2012, Alaska acquired a second round pick from Air21 in exchange for Bonbon Custodio. (The Express franchise was later sold to NLEX.) 
  On August 11, 2014, Alaska acquired Eric Menk from GlobalPort Batang Pier in exchange for two second round picks.
 On January 27, 2012, in a three-team trade, Barako Bull acquired a 2014 second round pick, Ronald Tubid and Reil Cervantes from Barangay Ginebra, San Mig Super Coffee (as B-Meg) acquired JC Intal and a second round pick from the Energy, and Ginebra acquired Kerby Raymundo from the Llamados and Dylan Ababou from the Energy.

Draft-day trades
   San Miguel acquired the draft rights to third pick Ronald Pascual from Barako Bull in exchange for Jojo Duncil, Chico Lañete, the draft rights to 22nd pick Gab Banal and a 2016 first round pick. San Miguel previously did not have a first round pick in this draft prior to the trade.
  GlobalPort acquired the draft rights to seventh pick Anthony Semerad and a 2016 first round pick from San Mig Coffee in exchange for a 2016 first round pick and a 2018 second round pick.

Undrafted players

References

External links
 PBA.ph

Philippine Basketball Association draft
Draft
Pba draft